Kamal means Lotus flower. It is a common female name in India mainly in Punjab. 

Kamal is a male given name used in several languages.

Kamal or Kamaal ( kamāl) or Turkish Kemal. The Arabic name which is also a noun means "perfection, superiority, distinction" and "completion, conclusion, accomplishment". The name bears the notion of "completeness of a thing without any deficiency" and "perfection of morals and ethics (adjective: اِكْتِمال iktimāl)". Also the name may be used as an abbreviation of Kamal ad-Din.
In Persian, it means "beauty, perfection, excellence, completion, utmost level".
In Sanskrit, it is usually spelled Kamala for females and Kamal for males, meaning "lotus" or "pale red".
In Turkish, it is the misspelling of Kamâl which means "siege, blockade, encirclement" (from the Uzbek qamal) and  "castle, rampart" (from the Kazakh qamal).

People with the given name Kamal
Kamal (director), commonly known name of Malayalam film (India) director Kamaluddin Mohammed
Kamal Adham, Turkish-born Saudi businessman and intelligence head
Kamal Amin, Egyptian artist
Kamâl Atatürk, the founder of the Turkish Republic
Kamal Kheir Beik, Syrian poet and dissident
Kamal Elfadel, Sudanese basketball player
Kamal Foroughi, British-Iranian businessman imprisoned in Iran
Kamal Haasan, film actor in Tamil cinema
Kamal Habibollahi, the final commander of the Imperial Iranian Navy
Kamal Heer, Indo-Canadian Punjabi singer
Kamal Hossain,  Bangladeshi lawyer and politician
Kamal Ibrahim, former Egyptian wrestler
Kamal Kaya Efendi, Turkish military officer
Kamal Khan (singer), Bollywood playback singer
Kamal Khera, Indian-born Canadian politician
Kamal Mamedbekov, one of the first honored architects of Azerbaijan
Kamal Hassan Mansur, Libyan politician
Kamal Martin (born 1998), American football player
Kamal Nasser, Palestinian political leader, writer and poet
Kamal Nath, Indian Union Minister
Kamal Rifaat, Egyptian military officer and politician
Kamal Ruhayyim, Egyptian writer
Kamal Al Din Salah, Egyptian diplomat
Kamal Sarabandi, Iranian-American scientist from University of Michigan
Kamal Shalorus, Iranian mixed martial arts fighter
Kamal al-Haydari, Iraqi Shia Cleric
Kamal Stino, Egyptian politician
Kamal al-Hadithi, Iraqi poet and journalist

People with the surname Kamal
Abdallah Kamal (1965–2014), Egyptian journalist and politician
Ali Abu Kamal, teacher and criminal responsible for the 1997 Empire State Building shooting
Ibrahim Ahmed Kamal, lead guitarist for Bangladeshi heavy metal bands Aurthohin and Warfaze
Mostafa Kamal (Bir Sreshtho), freedom fighter of Bangladesh Liberation War, awarded the highest recognition of bravery of Bangladesh, Bir Sreshtho.
Mustafa Kamal (politician), Bangladeshi politician, cricket official, and businessman
Osama Kamal (born 1959), Egyptian engineer and politician
Syed Kamal, Pakistani film actor, director and producer
Yousef Hussain Kamal, Qatari politician and businessman
Zahira Kamal, Palestinian activist and politician

Fictional characters
Kamal in Marvel comics
Alex Kamal, a spaceship pilot and one of the main characters in  the novel series The Expanse and in the eponymous TV series based on it.
Kamal, a race of snow demons from the continent Akavir in The Elder Scrolls; also the name of their nation

See also
Kamala (name), related female given name and surname
Kamahl (born 1934), Australian singer